Sośnica may refer to the following places:
Sośnica, Lower Silesian Voivodeship (south-west Poland)
Sośnica, Subcarpathian Voivodeship (south-east Poland)
Sośnica, Greater Poland Voivodeship (west-central Poland)
Sośnica, Silesian Voivodeship (south Poland)
Sośnica, Warmian-Masurian Voivodeship (north Poland)
Sośnica, West Pomeranian Voivodeship (north-west Poland)
Sośnica (district), district of Gliwice (south Poland)
Sośnica, Polish name for Sassnitz (north-east Germany)